Maneksha Kamaj Silva (born 9 April 1983 as කමාජ් සිල්වා [Sinhala]), is a Canada-based Sri Lankan entrepreneur and serial sneakerhead as well as a musician. He is the Founder and CEO of Sneakertub, the world's first and only Sneaker subscription service delivering a monthly package of several world renowned commercial shoe brands.

Personal life
Kamaj Silva was born on 9 April 1983 in Mount Lavinia, Sri Lanka as the only child of the family. His father Kamal Silva was a company director who died when he was a teenager. His mother Manel Silva was a housewife who also died. He completed education from S. Thomas’ College, Mount Lavinia. During school times, he played Basketball, volleyball and was an interacter.

He is married to his longtime partner, Roshani.

Career
In 2003 he went England for higher studies and graduated with a bachelor's degree in Computer Science from Staffordshire University. After graduation in England, he arrived Canada in 2007 and attended to Centennial College to complete Masters' in Film in 2011. Then he began the Children's Media program's internship component. First he interned at Phase 4 Films along with university professors, where he soon became a full-time children's media marketing coordinator. Later, he was promoted as the promotions manager where he continued to work for 18 months. Then he joined with "Entertainment One" as marketing manager and worked for three years.

He is also a vocalist, and a composer working as an independent musician specialized with alternative rock, soul blues and pop music. In 2010, he sung the popular song Wang Hung which made his mark in music career. Then in 2015, he released the song Makaru.

His passion for shoes came when he saw Michael Jordan play in Nikes. After he was able to attend the national show Dragons’ Den aired on Canadian Broadcasting Corporation (CBC) in 2017, he explained the tough life to establish as an entrepreneur. In 2016, he first started with a job as a marketing manager in Toronto. After few years of working, he founded the business titled "Sneakertub", started with just $700 and created a website within just two days. He also owns a Milk & Cereal themed streetwear boutique called "MILK" located in Toronto. The boutique is famous for selling and promoting major international brands as well as products from Canadian brands. In 2019, the boutique won the Award for the Best New Fashion Store in Toronto Awards Festivals.

Apart from his own businesses, Silva also works with a Sri Lankan tech company called "Alavi". In the meantime, he is also popular as a YouTuber, where he hosts multiple YouTube shows such as Daiya Show, Happy Hour, Api Nodanna Business and Kamaj Podcast.

References

External links
 ABOUT SNEAKERTUB
 The KAMAJ Show By Kamaj Silva
 NEVER Give Up ! with KAMAJ
 Coming Up In My Sneakers - 021 KAMAJ SILVA
 Life of Kamaj Silva started with 700 dollars

Living people
1983 births
21st-century Sri Lankan male singers
Sri Lankan businesspeople
Alumni of Staffordshire University
Alumni of S. Thomas' College, Mount Lavinia
People from Dehiwala-Mount Lavinia